Kawolo General Hospital, also Kawolo Hospital, is a hospital in Buikwe District in  the Central Region of Uganda.

Location
The coordinates of Kawolo General Hospital are: 0°22'05.0"N, 32°56'44.0"E (Latitude:0.368050; Longitude:32.945553).

Overview
Kawolo General Hospital was built in 1968. It has a bed capacity of 106. In 2015, it admitted 11,699 patients and delivered 3,784 babies. The hospital, which serves Buikwe District, and parts of Mukono District, Kayunga District and Buvuma District, handles a significant number of road traffic accidents on the Kampala–Jinja Highway.

Renovations
In 2008, the government of Uganda and the Kingdom of Spain signed a Debt Swap Agreement, involving the creation of a Trust Fund.  The resources of the Trust Fund will be used to finance the cost of a contract to finance the construction and equipping of Kawolo General Hospital. Open bidding for qualified Ugandan and Spanish firms to carry out the renovation was advertised from 29 April 2016 until 12 July 2016. The winning bidder is expected to be announced in September 2016 and contract signing is scheduled for the same month.

The contract, valued at about US$9 million includes the following works:

1. Expand the outpatients department 2. Built new operating rooms (operating theatre) 3. Build a new maternity centre, including antenatal department 4. Construct a trauma centre 5. Renovate existing staff residences 6. Build new staff houses for doctors, nurses and midwives and 7. Expand and equip existing mortuary.

See also
List of hospitals in Uganda

References

External links
 Website of Uganda Ministry of Health

Hospitals in Uganda
Buikwe District
Central Region, Uganda